Velká Kraš is a municipality and village in Jeseník District in the Olomouc Region of the Czech Republic. It has about 700 inhabitants.

History
The first written mention of Velká Kraš is from 1256.

During the World War II, the German occupiers operated two forced labour subcamps of the Stalag VIII-B/344 prisoner-of-war camp in the village. Four POWs attempted to escape from one of the subcamps and were killed by the Germans, and then buried in nearby Vidnava.

From 1973 to 1990, Velká Kraš was a part of Vidnava.

Twin towns – sister cities

Velká Kraš is twinned with:
 Neuburg an der Donau, Germany

References

External links

Villages in Jeseník District
Czech Silesia